Demetres J. Stephens (born September 9, 1990) is an American football wide receiver who is currently a free agent. He played college football at the University of Arkansas-Monticello. He was signed as an undrafted free agent by the San Antonio Talons in 2012.

Early life
Stephens attended John F. Kennedy High School in Los Angeles, California.

Professional career

San Antonio Talons
Stephens was assigned to the San Antonio Talons of the Arena Football League (AFL) in 2012.

San Jose SaberCats
On April 7, 2015, Stephens was assigned to the San Jose SaberCats.

Los Angeles KISS
On December 18, 2015, Stephens was assigned to the Los Angeles KISS.

Baltimore Brigade
On June 7, 2018, Stephens was assigned to the Baltimore Brigade.

Albany Empire
On March 13, 2019, Stephens was assigned to the Albany Empire.

References

External links
 Arkansas-Monticello bio
 Arena Football League bio

1990 births
Living people
American football wide receivers
College of the Canyons Cougars football players
Arkansas–Monticello Boll Weevils football players
San Antonio Talons players
Players of American football from Los Angeles
San Jose SaberCats players
Los Angeles Kiss players
Baltimore Brigade players
Albany Empire (AFL) players